Lake Georgetown is a reservoir on the north fork of the San Gabriel River in central Texas in the United States.  Lake Georgetown is a U.S. Army Corps of Engineers reservoir formed on the San Gabriel by the North San Gabriel Dam, which is located about three miles west of Georgetown, Texas.  The dam, lake, and all adjacent property are managed by the Fort Worth District of the U.S. Army Corps of Engineers.  The dam was officially completed on October 5, 1979, and serves to provide flood control for the community of Georgetown.  Lake Georgetown is also a source of drinking water for Georgetown and the nearby city of Round Rock.  The lake is also a popular recreational destination.

The other reservoir on the San Gabriel River is Granger Lake, located downstream of Lake Georgetown, near Granger, Texas.

Fish populations
Lake Georgetown has been stocked with several species of fish intended to improve the utility of the reservoir for recreational fishing.  Fish present in Lake Georgetown include largemouth bass, catfish, white bass, hybrid striped bass, crappie, and sunfish.

Recreational uses
In addition to maintaining the dam that creates the reservoir, the U.S. Army Corps of Engineers maintains recreational facilities at the lake.  Cedar Breaks Park, Russell Park, Jim Hogg Park and Overlook Park include day use areas for picnics.  Cedar Breaks Park, Jim Hogg Park and Russell Park have boat ramp facilities for recreational boating. No camping is permitted at Overlook park though it is the only free entry park on the lake.

The Goodwater Trail is a  hiking trail that follows the entire perimeter of the lake with trailheads at Cedar Breaks, Overlook, Jim Hogg, and Russell Park. Tejas Camp, while technically on the San Gabriel river and not on the lake, also has trail access and is the only other entry or exit point to the southern half of the trail besides Cedar Breaks. Mountain biking is allowed on the entire length of the loop thanks to the Austin Ridge Riders group for their work on the southern half of the trail. Beginner riders would be wise to stay on the North shore as it permits shorter trips with water refilling available and multiple exits. The southern shore presents a much more challenging ride with its rocky terrain and steep drop offs and is not recommended for beginners. Also there are no water refilling stations or trail exits between Cedar Breaks and Camp Tejas. (Approximately 12 miles)
Overnight primitive camping is allowed at Sawyer Park which rests roughly halfway between Cedar Breaks and Tejas.

External links

Official Lake Georgetown web site
Lake Georgetown - Texas Parks & Wildlife

Georgetown
Protected areas of Williamson County, Texas
Bodies of water of Williamson County, Texas
1979 establishments in Texas